Maxwell Leo "Max" Howell AO (né Maxwell Leopold Howell; 23 July 1927 – 3 February 2014) was an Australian educator and rugby union player. He played 5 Tests and 27 non-Test games for Australia between 1946 and 1948. He went on to become a physical education teacher and Professor at the University of Queensland. In 2003, he was appointed an Officer of the Order of Australia "for service to education as a pioneer in the development of sports studies and sport science as academic disciplines".

After his career as player he went to North America. Aligned with his sporting exploits, he pursued undergraduate and graduate study in Australia and North America in physical education, education psychology, exercise physiology, and sport history. He earned doctorate degrees from the University of California at Berkeley (Facilitation of motor learning by knowledge of performance analysis results Ed.D. 1954)  and from the University of Stellenbosch, South Africa (An historical survey of the role of sport in society, with particular reference to Canada since 1700. PhD 1969) He was also awarded an honorary Doctor of Laws Degree from the University of Alberta, Canada. During his academic career, Max held teaching and administrative posts at the University of British Columbia, the University of Alberta, San Diego State University, the University of Ottawa, and the University of Queensland.

At Alberta, Max began the graduate program in sport history from which a number of scholars in sport history have graduated, he was dean of the College of Professional Studies at San Diego State University, and he was the foundation chair and first professor of human movement studies at the University of Queensland. He was renowned for his capacity to stimulate graduate students in the field of sport history and significantly influenced programs in Canada, America, and Australia.

He published articles and books on a range of topics that included physiotherapy, motor learning, exercise physiology, comparative physical education, sport in antiquity, Canadian sport history, the history of sport in Australia, and more recently he wrote about Australian history and produced some fictional works. He is the author of two autobiographical works: The Shepherd Was Sleeping: A True Story of Love and Tragedy and Tragedy and Laughter on the Road to Oblivion: Around the Final Bend.

He was the President of the North American Society for Sport History (NASSH), President of the Canadian Association for Health, Physical Education and Recreation, and President of the Canadian Association of Sport Sciences.
NASSH honoured him with the annual Max and Reet Howell Memorial Address. He was married twice, the second, from 1974 until her death, to Reet Howell, PhD (née Reet Ann Nurmberg; 1945–1993), a scholar in comparative sports.

References

1927 births
2014 deaths
Australian rugby union players
Australia international rugby union players
Officers of the Order of Australia
People educated at Sydney Technical High School
Rugby union centres
Sports historians
Academic staff of the University of Queensland
Deaths from cancer in Queensland
Rugby union players from Sydney